Km. Mayawati Government Girls P.G. College is a girls college offering under graduate and post graduate courses in faculties of humanities, science, commerce and education run by State Government of U.P. NAAC grade B++(CGPA-2.91, Valid till Feb 2025) is highest in Government College of U.P. College is also ISO 9001-2015 certified. It was started as an arts graduate college in 1997 and it is situated at Badalpur village of Gautam Buddha Nagar district, Uttar Pradesh. It is affiliated to Chaudhary Charan Singh University.

References

Postgraduate colleges in Uttar Pradesh
Chaudhary Charan Singh University
Education in Gautam Buddh Nagar district
Educational institutions established in 1997
1997 establishments in Uttar Pradesh
Women's universities and colleges in Uttar Pradesh